This is a timeline of notable events in the history of the lesbian, gay, bisexual and trans community in Manchester.

19th century
1880
 The Manchester City Police raid a fancy dress ball which was taking place at the Temperance Hall in Hulme. 47 men were arrested and charged with soliciting and inciting each other to commit “improper actions”.

20th century

1940s
early 1940s
 The Union pub, now The New Union, plays host to drag shows during World War II. They were popular with American troops stationed nearby.

1950s
1950s
 The Union starts to attract an LGBT clientele.
1952
 Alan Turing is prosecuted for being in a relationship with another man. He dies by suicide in 1954.

1960s
1960s
 Manchester's gay scene is based in an area between Albert Square and Deansgate with pubs such as the Rockingham and Rouge being popular although The Union continues to be frequented by the gay community.

1964 
The North West Homosexual Law Reform Committee is founded by Labour councillor Allan Horsfall to campaign for the recommendations of The Wolfenden Report to be brought into law. The first meeting is held in Manchester. Three years later, the partial decriminalisation of sex between men over the age of 21 took place. The North West branch of the national Homosexual Law Reform Committee became the national Campaign for Homosexual Equality in 1969.
Rose Robertson sets up Parents Enquiry, the predecessor of FFLAG.

1970s
1973
 The Manchester Gay Alliance is formed by the University's Lesbian & Gay Society, CHE, a lesbian group and transvestite transsexual group.

1975
 2 January – The Manchester Gay Alliance opens the Manchester Gay Switchboard to provide support and information to callers. It originally operated in the basement of the University of Manchester. After receiving a council grant in 1978, the scheme found a new home on Bloom Street. By 1990, the switchboard teamed up with The Lesbian Link Helpline to form the Manchester Lesbian and Gay Switchboard.

1978
 The first edition of The Mancunian Gay Magazine is published.

1980s
1984 
 Manchester City Council forms the Equal Opportunities Committee. The numerous equality posts created included a Gay Men's Officer and a Lesbian Officer, first occupied by Paul Fairweather and Maggie Turner respectively.

1985 
 Manchester Pride is born following a £1,700 grant from the Manchester City council to put on a two-week celebration, complete with a huge banner adorning Oxford Street.

1986
 Europe's first purpose-built Gay Centre built in Manchester when Manchester City Council approved funding of £118,000. The centre, on Sidney Street, is still serving the community today.
1987
 Greater Manchester Police launches what will become the UK-wide Operation Spanner police investigation into same-sex male sadomasochism.

1988
 A huge anti-Section 28 protest is held in Manchester in which over 20,000 take to the streets to let their disquiet be heard. As a result, the Council produced over 6,000 leaflets that set out how they aimed to prevent LGBT staff and service users from receiving unequal treatment.

1989
 The Northwest Campaign for Lesbian & Gay Equality organises Manchester's "Celebration of Gay and Lesbian Diversity" Love Rights. It consists of a music festival at the Free Trade Hall and a political march starting at All Saints Park culminating in a rally with stalls in Albert Square. The main focus of the gay rights movement at the time was opposing Section 28.

1990s
1990
 Manto opens as the first bar in the area not to be hidden away. Instead the front of the bar featured windows, allowing passers-by to see in. The building was the first in the area to be clad with large plate glass windows. 
 The Albert Kennedy Trust opens in Manchester to support young homeless LGBT people. The Trust is opened following the death the previous year (30 April 1989) of Albert Kennedy who died after falling from a car park roof in Manchester city centre, while being chased by several attackers in a car.

1991
 Village Charity established and commences the festival then known as Manchester Mardi Gras, 'The Festival of Fun' it raised £15,000.

1992 
 22 May – Nightclub Cruz 101 opens.
 Families and Friends of Lesbians and Gays is launched.

1993
June – Nightclub The Paradise Factory opens.

1994
 Healthy Gay Manchester is formed.
 BiPhoria launches on September 1.

1995
  The UK's first conference on policing LGBT communities "Police and Diversity: An Agenda for Change" is hosted by the Greater Manchester Lesbian and Gay Policing Initiative at Manchester Town Hall, attracting approximately 350 delegates.

1996
 The first Poptastic club night takes place in Manchester.

1998 
The Bolton 7 are convicted of gross indecency. 
Manchester's gay and inclusive rugby union team Manchester Village Spartans is formed.
Bi Community News magazine moves to publishing in Manchester.

1999
 23 February – The first episode of Queer as Folk, a drama series based on Manchester's gay scene, is broadcast on Channel 4.
 23 September - The first Bi Visibility Day (known as International Celebrate Bisexuality Day at the time) is marked with a stall and social on Canal Street by BiPhoria, the only UK event to mark the date that year.

21st century

2000s
2000 
The Lesbian & Gay Foundation is formed following the merger of Healthy Gay Manchester and Manchester Lesbian & Gay Switchboard.
Mardi Gras is renamed Gayfest.
Essential nightclub opens.

2002 
The Mardi Gras event is almost cancelled following a row between Greater Manchester Police and organisers over drinking bylaws and crowd safety. The event went ahead and attracted 100,000 visitors.

2003 
Manchester hosts Europride and for the first time, the entire gay village area is gated off throughout the August bank holiday weekend with an entrance fee charged to get into the event. and at the final closing ceremony, it was announced that the event would now be known as "Manchester Pride".

2005 
 10 June - The first Sparkle weekend for the trans community is held on Canal Street.
 Manchester's gay and inclusive football team Village Manchester joins the GFSN National League.

2006
 14 August – Gaydio makes its first broadcast, transmitting for two weeks ahead of, and during, the 2006 Manchester Pride festival.
 The Paradise Factory closes following the sale of the venue.

2010s
2010 
18 June – Gaydio commences full-time broadcasting after being given a community licence by regulator Ofcom.

2012 
1-3 June – Manchester hosts the Bingham Cup, an international rugby union tournament featuring gay rugby union teams from across the world.
31 December – Legends nightclub closes when the building which hosts it is demolished to make way for a hotel. In the past the venue had hosted the legendary Twisted Wheel Club.

2015 
April – The Lesbian & Gay Foundation changes its name to the LGBT Foundation.

2016 
Carl Austin-Behan becomes Manchester's first openly gay Lord Mayor.

2019 
August – For the first time, elements of the Manchester Pride four-day August bank holiday festival are held outside of the Village when the music stage is moved to the site of the former Manchester Mayfield railway station. 'The Big Weekend' has been replaced by a ticketed event for 2019, with an entry fee of £71.

2020s
2022 
 Manchester Pride drops the concert element of the event. The change comes after a consultation with the LGBT+ community amid concerns about how the charity is run.

References

LGBT timelines
LGBT culture in Manchester
LGBT history in the United Kingdom
LGBT history in England
LGBT history in Manchester